Garth Ranzz, also known as Live Wire and Lightning Lad, is a superhero appearing in media published by DC Comics, usually those featuring the Legion of Superheroes, a 30th and 31st century group of which he is a founding member. He has the superhuman ability to generate electricity, usually in the form of lightning bolts.

The character first appeared in Adventure Comics #247 (April 1958).

Fictional character biography

Silver Age

Lightning Lad is a Winathian who was a founding member of the Legion of Super-Heroes along with Saturn Girl and Cosmic Boy. Born on the planet Winath, he is the twin brother of fellow Legionnaire Ayla Ranzz (Lightning Lass), the younger brother of the supervillain Mekt Ranzz (Lightning Lord), and the father of two sets of twins; sons Garridan (Validus) and Graym Ranzz and daughters Dacey and Dorrit Ranzz.

Early in the Legion's history, he sacrificed himself battling Zaryan the Conqueror, but was later resurrected by the sacrifice of Proty, Chameleon Boy's shapeshifting pet. However, a later retcon revealed that Proty's mind had actually taken over Lightning Lad's form. This retcon has since been eliminated from Legion canon.

An incident against a monster dubbed the "Super Moby Dick of space" resulted in the loss of Lightning Lad's right arm, which was replaced with a bionic appendage. He eventually had his arm regrown, but in the interim a criminal scientist used the situation to hypnotize Lightning Lad into acting as the super-criminal Starfinger, who used the bionic arm as a weapon. After the Great Darkness Saga, his son was abducted by Darkseid and he was subsequently transformed into the monster Validus.

During the "Five Year Gap" following the Magic Wars, Earth fell under the covert control of the Dominators, and withdrew from the United Planets. A few years later, the members of the Dominators' highly classified "Batch SW6" escaped captivity. Originally, Batch SW6 appeared to be a group of teenage Legionnaire clones, created from samples apparently taken just prior to Ferro Lad's death at the hands of the Sun-Eater. Later, they were revealed to be time-paradox duplicates, every bit as legitimate as their older counterparts. After Earth was destroyed in a disaster reminiscent of the destruction of Krypton over a millennium earlier, a few dozen surviving cities and their inhabitants reconstituted their world as New Earth. The SW6 Legionnaires remained, and their version of Lightning Lad assumed the code name Live Wire. Unlike the adult Garth, he did not possess Proty's mind or personality. Thus, the teenage Live Wire was far more reckless and rebellious than any previous depiction of Garth.

Zero Hour - Reboot

In the aftermath of Crisis on Infinite Earths Superman's origin was revamped and Superboy was erased from Superman's past. However, the Legion's history greatly revolved around Superboy, and that version of the character was retconned into being part of a "pocket universe", a solution which caused several continuity errors. After the Zero Hour miniseries, Legion history was completely rebooted. Garth's new history started when the twins went with Mekt on a trip in their parents' new space cruiser and became stranded on the barren planet Korbal after the cruiser's power cells drained. Ayla suggested that they use the "Lightning Beasts" (the only living things on the planet) in an attempt to recharge their cruiser. The only result of this, however, was that all three were found in comas the following day as a result of massive electrocution.

Months later, Garth and Ayla awoke simultaneously to find that Mekt had awoken around a week earlier, displayed electrical powers like the Beasts, threatened the staff, and vanished. After hearing this, they kept the fact that they had developed similar powers from their parents before Garth, thinking that the lightning had corrupted Mekt somehow and would soon corrupt them and refusing to believe that Mekt had developed into a sociopath just because he had been a "solo" on a world of twins, ran away from home to find Mekt (telling his parents he was going to visit his Aunt Ryth), despite Ayla's attempts to dissuade him.

Legion
Hearing that Mekt might be on Earth, he got on a shuttle bound for Earth via Titan, and met Rokk Krinn there. The two hit it off immediately, but although he developed a crush on her at first sight, Imra Ardeen gave him a frosty reception. Nonetheless, when she shouted that four "maintenance men" were actually assassins after R.J. Brande, the three worked together to stop them. This gave Brande an idea. Shortly after, a bar-room brawl caused Garth to be arrested, but just as his cellmates were about to beat him up, Triad-Orange came and posted his bail - Brande wanted a word. There, he found the other two Luornus had fetched Imra and Rokk. Brande, a follower of the 21st Century "Heroic Age", proceeded to talk the three of them into founding "a Legion of Super-Heroes", with Garth taking the codename Live Wire.

Despite early tension between him and Saturn Girl, Garth's initial period with the Legion passed with little trouble, until his sister showed up. At this point, they were only permitted to have one Legionnaire per world and Garth, classed as a runaway, was not who Winath wanted to represent them. Ayla, codenamed Spark, was apologetic, but neither of them had much choice in the matter and after he nearly leveled Legion Plaza in his fight with Ultra Boy (after UB had threatened Ayla), he quit rather than embarrass Rokk or Imra any more by letting them plead to let him stay.

Solo
After this, he joined Leland McCauley's Workforce to try to get the money to follow Mekt again, but only stayed with them a short time before McCauley's complete lack of morals became too much and he quit. Shortly afterward, he went to ask Brande if he could borrow a ship to find his brother. Since several stargates (the standard means of traveling faster than light, which Brande manufactured) had recently been destroyed and Brande didn't want to take any chances, he turned him down, but told him to go and visit Saturn Girl, who was in the hospital, having been mentally regressed to childhood by the strain from shutting down the Composite Man's mind. Upon seeing her have a toddler-style temper tantrum, though, he could not bring himself to go in.

Shortly after, several Daxamites attacked Earth, and when Garth visited Legion HQ to see if he could help, he was given a flight ring by Rokk and ordered to go and see Imra (who he'd seen pleading for Garth earlier). When she saw him, she threw her arms around him, and, by telling her that the Legion needed her - and that HE needed her - he talked her back to sanity.

At the end, the three founders stood on Legion HQ as Saturn Girl called the Daxamites there, just in time for Element Lad and Brainiac 5 to send them to a planet where they would be powerless, ending the threat.

Mekt
In the aftermath, however, he was once more forced off the team—and stung by Ayla's charge that he talked a good game on finding Mekt, but never actually did anything about it - he went on his travels again to try once more to find his wayward brother. After spending 27060 credits in his search, he found himself on the planet Bisbe, having been robbed of his last 512 credits. When trying to get his money back, he was arrested for murder under Mekt's name. Rather than protesting that he wasn't Mekt, he stayed silent, and just as the truth was discovered, Mekt broke through the wall and killed the police officer who was trying to dissuade Garth from taking Mekt's fall. When Garth saw just how insane Mekt had become, he tried to blast him, but was knocked out by his brother. Meanwhile, Ayla was told of Garth's arrest and the cop's electrocution, and she rushed straight to Bisbe.

Garth awoke just as they were entering Korbal's orbit, where Mekt started killing more beasts to increase his own power, so he would be the only one with lightning powers, a plan that did not involve Garth or Ayla. As Garth realized this, several Science Police cruisers flew overhead announcing that he was under arrest for the murder of a policeman. Mekt immediately began to down the cruisers, while Garth pleaded with Mekt to stop. Finally, when Ayla showed up, a ranting Mekt attacked her. Garth was finally forced to face the truth about Mekt, but Mekt, now more powerful than both of the twins together, retaliated by vaporizing Garth's right arm. Ayla grabbed Mekt's laser pistol and shot him in the leg, delaying him while she saw that Garth's wound had cauterized itself. Finally, as Mekt prepared to finish them off, Garth prompted Ayla to hold his remaining hand and let their powers run together freely. The resulting blast was enough to not only knock Mekt off his feet, but completely discharge him (not to mention turn his hair white). Mekt was finally arrested by the S.P., and (after a short stay in hospital) Garth was cleared of all charges.

While he was recovering from the ordeal, and getting used to his artificial arm, he was contacted by Cosmic Boy, who knew that President Chu was up to something, but he didn't know what and thus had to play along with her wishes (which included keeping Live Wire off the team). Rokk thus had Live Wire put together a secret "Rescue Squad". After recruiting Ultra Boy, Element Lad, Andromeda, Valor and XS, they saved the Legion from the Fatal Five. Both teams then divided into three, and all the heroes combined to have Chu impeached and arrested, and to prevent her (with the Fatal Five's help) from reviving the Braal-Titan War. R.J. Brande was then reluctantly drafted as the new U.P. president, and his first act was to abolish the U.P.-installed membership restrictions on the team, allowing Garth to rejoin.

Garth was killed during the "Legion Lost" storyline, sacrificing himself in battle with the Progenitor (actually an insane Element Lad). A few crystals were left from the destruction of the Progenitor, which Kid Quantum took with her upon the Lost Legion's return to the "first" galaxy; she left the crystals on Shanghalla (the heroes' graveyard). It turned out Garth's essence survived in the crystals and Jan's body regrew but with Garth's mind. He was apparently able to use both the Element Lad and Lightning Lad powers in the new crystalline body. His relationship with other Legionnaires, including Saturn Girl, was strained due to his outward resemblance to the Progenitor.

In the Final Crisis: Legion of 3 Worlds miniseries, the post-Zero Hour Legion is brought to the pre-crisis Legion's timeline, to help battle Superboy Prime and the Legion of Super-Villains. During this time, the pre-crisis Brainiac 5 uses a specially charged lightning rod to increase the transmutation ability of Element Lad's body, allowing Garth to mutate the body itself into a match for his own.

Threeboot

In the 2005 Waid/Kitson revamp, Garth Ranzz (again as Lightning Lad) remains a charter member of the galactic youth movement the Legion has become (it is revealed that he coined the first Legion motto—"Eat it, Grandpa!") He and Saturn Girl share an intimate connection, and Garth notes that one has to be "way honest" to date a telepath. He is protective of his twin, Light Lass, and bears a slight grudge against Brin Londo for his treatment of Ayla. One of the Legion's fiercest fighters, he almost single-handedly routed the terrorist group Terra Firma in their first skirmish with the Legion. Made acting leader in the wake of the Lemnos crisis, it was Lightning Lad who signed the accord which officially named the Legion as an arm of the United Planets and saved hundreds of Legionnaires from being brutally deported by the Science Police. He is the Legion member who has logged the least time on Earth, tending to prefer exploring space, as if searching for something, revealed to be his older brother, Mekt, who ultimately came to Earth, himself, leading his own super team known as "The Wanderers". This fact, and his almost total dedication to the Legion's cause puts a serious strain on his relationship with Saturn Girl, eventually putting her in Ultra Boy's arms.

Post-"Infinite Crisis"
The events of the 2005–2006 "Infinite Crisis" storyline restored a close analogue of the Pre-"Crisis on Infinite Earths" Legion to continuity, as seen in "The Lightning Saga" story arc in Justice League of America and Justice Society of America, and in the "Superman and the Legion of Super-Heroes" story arc in Action Comics.  Lightning Lad is included in their number, and is still married to Saturn Girl.

Garth later escorts Superman back to the present, where the two take time to reminisce on certain teenage misadventures in the Fortress of Solitude. The two are then joined by Batman, who reveals that the bodies of Karate Kid and Una were found in Gotham City. Garth and Batman react with hostility towards one another, given Batman's distrust of time travelers. Garth goes back to the 31st Century with Karate Kid and Una's bodies, but not before giving Superman a new flight ring and giving Batman a veiled warning about upcoming struggles.

In the 2009 revival of Adventure Comics Garth is sent by an imprisoned Mekt to uncover the truth about whether Mekt was in fact a single birth, or whether his suspicions are correct that he does have a twin and that his parents have covered this up. It remains to be seen whether he is telling the truth, is lying, or has deluded himself into believing this. If it is true, this revelation would be a significant alteration to the characters' backstory.

In the "Watchmen" sequel "Doomsday Clock", Lightning Lad is among the Legion of Super-Heroes members that appear in the present after Doctor Manhattan undid the experiment that erased the Legion of Super-Heroes and the Justice Society of America.

Powers and abilities
Lightning Lad has the ability to generate electricity within his own body without harming himself. This electricity he is able to discharge in the form of potent "lightning bolts" (in some undisclosed way his power prevents these bolts from taking the path of least resistance to Earth, such that he is able to target objects with great accuracy). He can also create flashing lettering which can be seen from great distances. He has occasionally displayed a limited control of weather. In more recent versions of the character, Garth is also able to direct his electric powers internally so as to move at superhuman speed, with his top speed being approximately one-third the speed of light. Lightning Lad is immune to the harmful effects of electric currents, not only those currents which he himself generates.

As a member of the Legion of Super-Heroes he is provided a Legion Flight Ring. It allows him to fly and protects him from the vacuum of space and other dangerous environments.

In other media

Television
 Lightning Lad makes non-voiced cameo appearances in the Superman: The Animated Series episode "New Kids In Town" and the Justice League Unlimited episode "Far From Home".

 Lightning Lad is part of the core Legion team in the Legion of Super-Heroes series, voiced by Andy Milder. This version is the Legion's field leader, and has a lightning-shaped scar over his right eye which glows when his powers are activated. He is also portrayed as brash and hot-headed with a somewhat competitive attitude towards Superman, though they seem to develop a closer relationship later on. In the episode "Chained Lightning", Garth loses his right arm during a battle with his brother Mekt when Imperiex attacked, and gained a new arm called the Cybernetic 4000 that can fire explosive charges and lasers all powered by his own electrical abilities. It is also revealed that Ayla had not died during the Lightning Beast attack as they originally thought, but instead became an energy vortex that Imperiex attempted to use to power a new weapon. With Mekt's help, Garth was able to restore Ayla to normal.

 Garth Ranzz / Lightning Lad appears in the CW series Smallville, portrayed by Calum Worthy. He appeared with Cosmic Boy and Saturn Girl in the episode "Legion" where Garth is generally portrayed as an overzealous fan of Clark Kent who initially expresses disappointment in Clark's attitude before Clark rallies them to help defeat Brainiac.

Film
 Lightning Lad appears in Lego DC Comics Super Heroes: Justice League: Cosmic Clash, voiced again by Andy Milder. He appears with Saturn Girl and Cosmic Boy as the Legion of Super Heroes' last surviving members in the year 2116, where Brainiac has taken control over the Earth and Superman. When Batman attempts to free Superman from Brainiac's control and send Superman back to the present, the Legion attempts to slow down Superman, but are presumably killed by him, only later revealed to be an illusion cast by Saturn Girl. After Batman succeeds in freeing Superman from Brainiac's control and sending the Man of Steel back to the present, the Legion give Batman their last Time Bubble to send the Dark Knight home.

Video games
 Garth Ranzz is alluded in Injustice 2. His codename is used as a joke by Harley Quinn to mockingly refer to Black Adam and Black Lightning. Lightning Lad and the Legion of Superheroes' other members are seen in Brainiac's ending where Brainiac 5 posed as Brainiac to defeat him. While they grilled Brainiac 5 for going back in time to stop Brainiac, they are pleased that Brainiac 5 stopped Brainiac's rampage.

References

External links
 LIGHTNING LAD at the LEGION Collection

DC Comics aliens
DC Comics cyborgs
DC Comics extraterrestrial superheroes
DC Comics superheroes
DC Comics characters who can move at superhuman speeds
Comics characters introduced in 1958
Fictional twins
Fictional amputees
Fictional characters with electric or magnetic abilities
Fictional characters with weather abilities
Fictional characters with absorption or parasitic abilities
Characters created by Otto Binder